Haemagogus is a genus of mosquitoes in the dipteran family Culicidae. They mainly occur in Central America and northern South America (including Trinidad), although some species inhabit forested areas of Brazil, and range as far as northern Argentina. In the Rio Grande Do Sul area of Brazil, one species, H. leucocelaenus, has been found carrying yellow fever virus. Several species have a distinct metallic sheen.

Species of this genus are vectors in the transmission of sylvan or "jungle" yellow fever, which is often carried by monkeys in the forest canopies. Haemagogus species have also been found to carry the Mayaro virus and Ilheus virus. As these mosquitoes, in general, have relatively long lives, they can transmit viruses for long periods. 

They tend to live in the canopy of forests, where the female lays eggs in between layers of tree bark or in cut bamboo. The eggs adhere to the surface and when submerged by rain water develop into larvae.

Species
Haemagogus acutisentis Arnell, 1973
Haemagogus aeritinctus Galindo & Trapido, 1967
Haemagogus albomaculatus Theobald, 1903
Haemagogus anastasionis Dyar, 1921
Haemagogus andinus Osorno-Mesa, 1944
Haemagogus argyromeris Dyar & Ludlow, 1921
Haemagogus baresi Cerqueira, 1960
Haemagogus boshelli Osorno-Mesa, 1944
Haemagogus capricornii Lutz, 1904
Haemagogus celeste Dyar & Nunez Tovar, 1926
Haemagogus chalcospilans Dyar, 1921
Haemagogus chrysochlorus Arnell, 1973
Haemagogus clarki Galindo, Carpenter and Trapido, 1952
Haemagogus equinus Theobald, 1903 
Haemagogus iridicolor Dyar, 1921
Haemagogus janthinomys Dyar, 1921
Haemagogus leucocelaenus Dyar & Shannon, 1924
Haemagogus leucophoebus Galindo, Carpenter and Trapido, 1952
Haemagogus leucotaeniatus Komp, 1938
Haemagogus lucifer Howard, Dyar & Knab, 1912
Haemagogus mesodentatus Komp & Kumm, 1938
Haemagogus nebulosus Arnell, 1973
Haemagogus panarchys Dyar, 1921
Haemagogus regalis Dyar & Knab, 1906
Haemagogus soperi Levi-Castillo, 1955
Haemagogus spegazzinii Brethes, 1912
Haemagogus splendens Williston, 1896
Haemagogus tropicalis Cerqueira & Antunes, 1938

Yellow fever epidemics involving Haemagogus species
The discovery in 1953 by two scientists from the Trinidad Regional Virus Laboratory of a sick Red Howler monkey that was found to be suffering from yellow fever provided the first indication that yellow fever was still endemic in Trinidad although there had not been a case reliably reported from Trinidad since an outbreak in 1914. Blood specimens taken from over 4,500 humans in late 1953 and early 1954 and checked to detect the presence of a wide variety of known viruses showed that 15% had antibodies to the yellow fever virus. A form of the disease, termed "jungle yellow fever", was shown to be carried by Red Howler monkeys (Alouatta seniculus insulanus Elliot) that provided a continuous reservoir for the disease, which was then spread by the Haemagogus s. spegazzini mosquito which normally inhabits rainforest regions, both at ground level and in the treetops. 

After government felling of large stands of native forest, yellow fever was isolated from a patient from Cumaca in the northern range in 1954. The infection soon spread to other humans and into the Aedes aegypti mosquito population, greatly increasing transmission. Warnings were made that an epidemic was imminent and Dr. Wilbur Downs and Dr. A. E. (Ted) Hill, a specialist in tropical medicine, began a program of inoculating health workers and stockpiling vaccine. Trinidad health authorities followed up with large-scale vaccination and intensive anti-aegypti measures including public education, regular inspection for breeding sites, and spraying of domestic residences with DDT. In spite of these measures, and the fact that an estimated 80% of the population of Port of Spain were immune to yellow fever and dengue, several more cases were soon reported. Most probably due to the health measures taken, it did not develop into a widespread epidemic in Trinidad itself.

An attempt was made to totally quarantine the island just before Christmas, 1954, but the disease spread to the nearby mainland of Venezuela and, from there, all the way to southern Mexico, probably killing several thousand people in the process.

In 1998 an epidemic of yellow fever killed many Howler monkeys near the city of Altamira, Pará in the eastern Amazon basin, in Brazil. The virus was isolated in specimens of Haemagogus janthinomys mosquitoes.

Footnotes

References
 The Arthropod-borne Viruses of Vertebrates: An Account of The Rockefeller Foundation Virus program 1951-1970. 1973. Max Theiler and W. G. Downs. Yale University. .
 Global Mapping of Infectious Diseases: Methods, Examples and Emerging Applications. (1963). Edited by S. I. Hay, Alastair Graham, David J. Rogers. Updated edition with DVD 2007. Academic Press; Pbk/Dvdr R edition. .

External links
Haemagogus at Encyclopedia of Life

World Health Report on Yellow Fever

Aedini
Mosquito genera
Taxa named by Samuel Wendell Williston